Diadophis punctatus edwardsii, commonly known as the northern ringneck snake, is a subspecies of Diadophis punctatus, a snake in the family Colubridae. The subspecies is endemic to North America.

Etymology
The subspecific name, edwardsii, is in honor of English ornithologist George Edwards, who described it, without giving it a binomial name, from a specimen he had received from William Bartram.

Description
The northern ringneck snake has a body color from bluish grey to black, with a complete narrow yellow or orange ring around its neck and an underside matching the ring and generally lacking any dark spotting or patterning. The complete ring and lack of large dark spots on the belly differentiate it from other subspecies of D. punctatus. In some regions, there are areas of intergradation with other subspecies.

Geographic range
In Canada D. p. edwardsii is found in the southern parts of Ontario, Quebec, and New Brunswick, and also in Nova Scotia. In the United States it is found throughout New England, the Mid-Atlantic states, and the Great Lakes region, and also at higher elevations in the South. More specifically, it is found in the following: NE Alabama, Connecticut, NW Georgia, SE Illinois, S Indiana, Kentucky, W Maryland, Massachusetts, Michigan, NE Minnesota, N New Jersey, New York, W North Carolina, Ohio, Pennsylvania, Rhode Island, extreme NW South Carolina, E Tennessee, W (western) Virginia, West Virginia, Wisconsin, and Florida.

Behavior
D. p. edwardsii is nocturnal and prone to hiding and traveling under rocks, fallen logs and leaf litter, so it is not commonly observed by people despite the potential abundant population density. Another subspecies in Kansas was found to have densities of 700 to 1,800 per . It is also social, and multiple ringnecks may be found in the same hiding spot during any season.

Habitat
The favored habitat of the northern ringneck snake over most of its range is a moist wooded area, but it will also use the edges of wetlands or open areas in mountainous or hilly terrain. It is also often found in moist humid basements.

Reproduction
A female D. p. edwardsii will lay her clutch of 2 to 10 eggs under a rock or in moist and rotting wood. Other female snakes may also use the same laying site, leading to single site egg finds of up to the mid fifties. The eggs hatch after about two months, and the young look essentially the same as the adults, possibly with a brighter color shade on the ring and belly. Egg laying is normally in early summer and hatching in late summer.

Hibernation
In the winter D. p. edwardsii hibernates in locations from stone walls or cellars to small mammal burrows to brush piles or rotting logs.

Diet
D. p. edwardsii preys upon insects, salamanders, earthworms, slugs, small lizards, small snakes, and frogs. The red-backed salamander (Plethodon cinereus) is a favorite food.

As prey
D. p. edwardsii is known to be preyed upon by bullfrogs, toads, five species of predatory birds and six mammal species including shrews. Very young Northern ringneck snakes may also be eaten by large centipedes or large spiders.

References

Further reading
Behler JL, King FW (1979). The Audubon Society Field Guide to North American Reptiles and Amphibians. New York: Alfred A. Knopf. 743 pp. . (Diadophis punctatus edwardsi, p. 601).
Merrem B (1820). Versuchs eines Systems der Amphibien: Tentamen Systematis Amphibiorum. Marburg: J.C. Krieger. xv + 191 pp. + one plate. (Coluber edwardsii, new species, p. 136). (in German and Latin).

External links
 
 
 
 
 
 .
 
 Northern Ringneck Snake, Natural Resources Canada.

Colubrids
Fauna of New England
Reptiles of the United States
Reptiles of Ontario